FEVA TV (acronym for First Entertainment Voice of Africa) is a Canadian English language exempt Category B specialty channel owned by Wells Multimedia Entertainment Inc. FEVA TV broadcasts general entertainment programming aimed at those who appreciate Black and African entertainment. Programming categories include movies, music, comedies, dramas, documentaries, and talk shows. FEVA TV was founded by Robert Onianwah and Dr. Idahosa Wells Okunbo.

FEVA is an acronym and a Caribbean English spelling of the word "fever."

History
Originating as an Internet-based video service in September 2013, shortly after its launch, the company began talks with television service providers to launch the service as a television channel. On August 28, 2014, the service officially launched in Canada as a television channel.

Since its launch within Canada, the service began expansion globally through distribution agreements with Flow, which saw the channel launch in the summer of 2015 in Flow's markets in the Caribbean including Antigua, Barbados, Curaçao, Grenada, Jamaica, Trinidad and Tobago, St. Lucia, and St. Vincent & the Grenadines. In addition, in September 2016, the channel entered the United States when it launched as a digital sub-channel of WDFL-LD channel 18, a low-powered television station in  Miami, Florida. In summer 2021, the channel reached its first African distribution agreement with AzamTV, launching on its system in Tanzania, Uganda, Kenya, Burundi, Rwanda, and Malawi.

References

External links
 Official website

Digital cable television networks in Canada
Television channels and stations established in 2014
English-language television stations in Canada
Black Canadian culture in Toronto
Multicultural and ethnic television in Canada